Mark Rosslyn Bowen (born 7 December 1963) is a Welsh football manager and former professional footballer. He is currently Head of Football Operations at Reading.

A left-back who also played in midfield, Bowen notably played in the Premier League for Norwich City, West Ham United and Charlton Athletic, having initially played in the top flight with Tottenham Hotspur. He also played in the Football League with Wigan Athletic and Reading, as well as in Japan with Shimizu S-Pulse. He was capped 41 times by Wales, scoring 3 goals.

Since retiring in 1999, he has worked as assistant and First team coach to former international teammate Mark Hughes with Wales, Blackburn Rovers, Manchester City, Fulham, Queens Park Rangers, Stoke City and Southampton. Bowen was Head Coach and Manager for Reading during the 2019–20 season.

Playing career
Bowen joined Tottenham Hotspur as an apprentice in 1980, signing his first professional contract in December 1981. First-team opportunities were limited for him at White Hart Lane and he made only 20 full appearances for the club though he was a member of the successful Tottenham Hotspur Squad of the 1984 UEFA Cup Final. In the summer of 1987, Norwich City manager Ken Brown paid Spurs £90,000 for Bowen, who was one of a number of players that Norwich signed from Tottenham during that period. He made his debut for the Canaries on 19 August 1987 in a league match against Southampton at Carrow Road. Mark Bowen scored his first goal for Norwich City against West Ham United on New Year's Day 1988 in a 4–1 win at home in the first division.

Bowen spent much of his first season at Norwich playing on the left of midfield, but soon, Bowen made the left-back spot his own for the next eight years. As well as carrying out his defensive duties in a consistent and dependable manner, Bowen was a threat going forward and in the 1989–90 season he finished as the team's joint top league goalscorer. That season, he also collected the Barry Butler memorial trophy when the supporters voted him Norwich City player of the year.

On 8 April 1989, Bowen was involved in an unusual incident in a match against Coventry City at Highfield Road. Goalkeeper Bryan Gunn was sent off for arguing incessantly with the referee after he had awarded Coventry a penalty kick. Bowen went in goal to replace him, only for Coventry's specialist penalty taker Brian Kilcline to miss the spot-kick by putting it wide. Coventry won 2–1.

Bowen was a key member of the Norwich team that finished third in the inaugural season of the FA Premier League after topping the table for most of that season (1992–93) and qualified for the UEFA Cup as a result. In the second round of the UEFA Cup run, Bowen scored one of the most famous goals in Norwich City's history when his header put Norwich 2–0 up in the away leg against FC Bayern Munich. Norwich won the match 2–1 and remained as the only British club to beat FC Bayern at their own stadium until Chelsea defeated Bayern at the Allianz Arena in the 2012 UEFA Champions League Final. Arsenal later did the same, though they lost their tie on aggregate following defeat at home.

At the end of the 1994–95 season, Norwich were relegated from the Premiership, many thought, due to the continually selling of key players. The season that followed was one of the worst in the club's history and it was Bowen's last at Carrow Road. The club was in a desperate financial position and came close to going out of business. Gary Megson replaced Martin O'Neill as manager halfway through the season and although and ex team mate, he and Bowen did not enjoy a good relationship. Bowen was critical of what he saw of the club's situation and was dropped from the team by Megson when he had played 399 matches for the club. He was not given the opportunity for a 400th. At the end of the season, as the club began trying to pick up the pieces after chairman Robert Chase had left the club close to bankruptcy, Bowen was one of the players released in order to reduce the club's outgoings.

Bowen was highly regarded by the Canaries' fans. For example, in 2002, in a survey to mark the club's centenary, Norwich fans voted Bowen the club's best ever left-back and put him in the club's 'all-time XI'. He is also a member of the Norwich City F.C. Hall of Fame. He won 35 Welsh caps while at Norwich, meaning that he holds the record for being the club's most capped player. He was nicknamed 'Taff' because of his Welsh connections.

After leaving Carrow Road, Bowen signed for West Ham United making his debut appearance on 21 August 1996 in a 1–1 home draw against Coventry City. He made 20 appearances for The Hammers in all competitions scoring one goal in a 2–0 away win against Nottingham Forest on 21 September 1996. In January 1997 he signed a lucrative contract for Shimizu S-Pulse in Japan, again on a free transfer, before signing for Charlton Athletic shortly after the start of the 1997–98 season. He was a member of the Addicks side that won promotion to the Premiership at the end of that season after a memorable play-off final against Sunderland at Wembley ended 4–4. Charlton won the penalty shoot-out, with Bowen scoring one of the spot-kicks. For a while during his time at Norwich Bowen had been the team's penalty taker. He scored just twice from the spot for Norwich, against Notts County and Queens Park Rangers respectively.

That 1998 play-off final proved to be the last high-point of Bowen's playing career. He left Charlton a year later having suffered a serious injury and he played briefly for Wigan Athletic and Reading.

Coaching career
Bowen began his coaching career while at Reading as Mark Hughes made him Assistant Manager for the Welsh national side. He then linked up with former Norwich teammate Steve Bruce when he was manager first at Crystal Palace, then at Birmingham City. In 2002, under Bruce and Bowen's stewardship, Birmingham won promotion to the Premier League via the play-offs. They won the final against Norwich City in a penalty shoot-out after the match had ended 1–1. Bowen remained at Birmingham for two more years taking them to 10th position in the Premier League before leaving in the summer of 2004. Shortly afterwards in August 2004 Bowen returned to the Wales national team set-up. The move caused some controversy as Hughes appointed Bowen without the knowledge of the Football Association of Wales.

On 16 September 2004, Hughes was appointed manager at Blackburn Rovers and Bowen joined him as assistant manager. Whilst at Blackburn, Bowen was linked with the managerial vacancy at West Brom, Norwich City and Swansea City. In June 2008, Bowen followed Hughes to Manchester City as assistant manager, and left the club with him in December 2009 with club sitting 3rd in Premier League and in semi final of League Cup. Whilst at Manchester City the club was taken over by the wealthy Abu Dhabi United Group.

In August 2010, Bowen again followed Hughes, to become his assistant at Fulham. An eighth place Premier League place was achieved. Hughes and Bowen turned down contract offers from Fulham due to uncertainties as to how the club was being run at that time. Following Hughes departure in June 2011, Bowen also left the club. Bowen worked with Hughes at Queens Park Rangers for a year, saving the club from relegation from the Premier League in 2011. Hughes was sacked in November 2012. Bowen took caretaker charge of QPR for one match against Manchester United in a 3–1 defeat.

Bowen then joined Hughes at Stoke City in June 2013. Three top ten Premier League finishes followed - Which was Stoke City's highest ever position in Premier League. He remained at Stoke until January 2018.

After Hughes was appointed Southampton manager in March 2018, Bowen followed him to St. Mary's, initially on a contract for the remainder of the 2017–18 season. In May 2018, after successfully steering Southampton to Premier League safety, it was announced that Bowen had signed a new long-term contract. On 3 December 2018, he was dismissed following the sacking of Mark Hughes. His Premier league coaching career now spanning some 537 Premier League games.

On 27 March 2019, Bowen was hired as a technical consultant for Reading. He was announced as the club's sporting director on 21 August, and succeeded José Gomes as manager on 14 October. Prior to being appointed manager he had been tasked with drawing up a shortlist of candidates for the job he eventually was offered. On 17 January 2020, Bowen extended his contract until the end of the 2020–2021 season. Bowen took Reading from 23rd in Championship table to a respectable 14th - a rise of nine places. On 29 August 2020, Bowen was replaced as manager by Veljko Paunović, and despite being offered a new role by the club as Sport Director, his departure from Reading was confirmed on 31 August 2020.

On 30 March 2022, Bowen was appointed manager of League One club AFC Wimbledon until the end of the season with the club sitting in 21st position, one point from safety with seven matches remaining. On 7 May 2022, it was announced that Bowen would be departing the club for a role elsewhere.

In May 2022, following his departure from AFC Wimbledon, Bowen returned to Reading as Head of Football Operations.

Career statistics
Sourced from

Club

A.  The "Other" column constitutes appearances and goals in the Football League Trophy, Football League play-offs and Full Members Cup, Screen Sport Super Cup and UEFA Cup.

International
Bowen made his senior debut for Wales on 10 May 1986, aged 22, in a 2–0 friendly defeat to Canada in North America. His final Wales appearance came 11 years later on 11 February 1997 in a goalless friendly draw with the Republic of Ireland at Cardiff Arms Park. He was capped 41 times as a full international for Wales, scoring three goals.

Managerial

Honours
Tottenham Hotspur
 UEFA Cup winner: 1984

Norwich City
 Norwich City player of the year: 1990

Charlton Athletic
 Football League First Division play-off final winner: 1998

References

External links

Career info at ex-canaries.co.uk
International stats at 11v11

1963 births
Living people
Footballers from Neath
Welsh footballers
Welsh expatriate footballers
Wales under-21 international footballers
Wales international footballers
Tottenham Hotspur F.C. players
West Ham United F.C. players
Charlton Athletic F.C. players
Wigan Athletic F.C. players
Reading F.C. players
Norwich City F.C. players
Premier League players
Shimizu S-Pulse players
J1 League players
Welsh expatriate sportspeople in Japan
Expatriate footballers in Japan
Blackburn Rovers F.C. non-playing staff
Fulham F.C. non-playing staff
Queens Park Rangers F.C. non-playing staff
Southampton F.C. non-playing staff
Stoke City F.C. non-playing staff
English Football League players
Manchester City F.C. non-playing staff
Queens Park Rangers F.C. managers
Association football fullbacks
UEFA Cup winning players
Welsh football managers
Premier League managers
English Football League managers
Reading F.C. managers
Reading F.C. non-playing staff
Crystal Palace F.C. non-playing staff
AFC Wimbledon managers
Association football coaches